Flood Tide is a 1958 American CinemaScope drama film noir romance film directed by Abner Biberman and starring George Nader, Cornell Borchers, and Michel Ray.

Plot
A 10-year-old boy's testimony results in Bill Holeran being sent to prison. Steve Martin, landlord to widow Anne Gordon and her young son, suspects that something is amiss with the child's story, and resumes a romantic relationship with Anne that he had previously broken off, in order to get at the truth.

Cast
 George Nader as Steve Martin
 Cornell Borchers as Anne Gordon
 Michel Ray as David Gordon
 Judson Pratt as Maj. Harvey Thornwald - Naval Doctor
 Joanna Moore as Barbara Brooks
 Charles Arnt as Mr. Appleby - Grocer (as Charles E. Arnt)
 Russ Conway as Bill Holeran
  John Morley as Detective lieutenant
 John Maxwell as John Brighton - Halleran's Attorney
 Carl Bensen as Dist. Atty. Adams
 Della Malzahn as Beverly
 Hugh Lawrence as Charlie "Barney" Barnum

See also
 List of American films of 1958

External links

1958 films
1958 romantic drama films
American romantic drama films
American black-and-white films
Films scored by Henry Mancini
Universal Pictures films
CinemaScope films
Films scored by William Lava
1950s English-language films
1950s American films